Victoria is a British historical television drama series created and principally written by Daisy Goodwin, starring Jenna Coleman as Queen Victoria. The series premiered in the United Kingdom on ITV on 28 August 2016 with eight episodes, and in the United States on PBS on 15 January 2017; PBS supported its production as part of the Masterpiece anthology. The series follows Victoria's early life, including her relationship with her husband Albert and her political responsibilities of the 1830s to the 1850s.

A second series was broadcast on ITV in 2017, including a Christmas special that aired that December; PBS broadcast followed starting in January 2018, with the special belatedly airing in March. In December 2017, Victoria was renewed for an eight-episode third series, which premiered on PBS on 13 January 2019, and on ITV on 24 March 2019 before concluding on 12 May 2019. As of July 2021, ITV confirmed that there were no active plans for a fourth series.

Premise
The first series (covering 1837-1840) depicts the first few years of the reign of Queen Victoria (portrayed by Jenna Coleman), from her accession to the British throne at the age of 18 (1837), to her intense friendship and infatuation with her favourite advisor Lord Melbourne (Rufus Sewell), to her courtship and early marriage (1840) to Prince Albert (Tom Hughes) of Germany, and finally to the birth of their firstborn child and eldest daughter, Victoria, Princess Royal (born 1840).

The second series (covering 1840-1849) follows Queen Victoria's struggles to balance her queenly role as the youngest monarch with her duties to her husband and children, various dramas within the English and German branches of the royal family, international relations with France, and such crises as the Anglo-Afghan War (1838-1842) and the 1840s Famine in Ireland (1845-1849).

At the beginning of the third series (covering 1849-1851), Victoria and Albert (both ages 30-32) have six children and have just entered their early 30s while navigating difficulties in their marriage; as the series progresses, these tensions ebb and flow. Subplots in the third series include Albert's ongoing efforts to find his place, culminating in The Great Exhibition (1851), and his efforts to mould his eldest son (ages 7-9) into a king; Victoria's political relationship with the charismatic Lord Palmerston; the sudden arrival of Queen Victoria's estranged maternal half-sister, Princess Feodora, at the palace; and a forbidden romance between one of the Queen's ladies and a footman.

Cast

Main

 Jenna Coleman as Queen Victoria
 Tom Hughes as Prince Albert, Victoria's husband
 Peter Bowles as The Duke of Wellington, Former Prime Minister of the United Kingdom (series 1–3)
 Catherine Flemming as The Duchess of Kent, Victoria's mother who is widow of Prince Edward, Duke of Kent and Strathearn (series 1–2)
 Daniela Holtz as Baroness Lehzen, Victoria's governess (series 1–2)
 Nell Hudson as Nancy Skerrett, Principal Dresser to the Queen (series 1–3)
 Ferdinand Kingsley as Mr Francatelli, Royal Chef to the Queen (series 1–3)
 Tommy Knight as Archibald Brodie, Bell Boy to the Queen (Series 1 - 3)
 Nigel Lindsay as Sir Robert Peel, Prime Minister of the United Kingdom (series 1–2)
 Eve Myles as Mrs Jenkins, Senior Dresser to the Queen (series 1)
 David Oakes as Prince Ernest, Albert's brother who is the Queen's first cousin (series 1–2)
 Paul Rhys as Sir John Conroy, the Duchess of Kent's comptroller (series 1)
 Adrian Schiller as Mr Cornelius Penge, footman at Kensington Palace; later footman at Buckingham Palace
 Peter Firth as King Ernest Augustus, Victoria's paternal uncle (series 1–2)
 Alex Jennings as King Leopold, King of the Belgians who is Victoria's and Albert's uncle, the Duchess of Kent's younger brother (and widower of Princess Charlotte of Wales)
 Rufus Sewell as Lord Melbourne, Prime Minister of the United Kingdom (series 1–2)
 Bebe Cave as Lady Wilhelmina Paget (née Coke), Lord Alfred's wife (series 2)
 Margaret Clunie as Harriet, Duchess of Sutherland, the Queen's lady-in-waiting (recurring series 1, main series 2)
 Tilly Steele as Miss Cleary, Junior Dresser to the Queen (series 2)
 Leo Suter as Mr. Drummond, Sir Robert Peel's private secretary (series 2)
 Jordan Waller as Lord Alfred Paget, Clerk Marshal to the Queen (recurring series 1, main series 2–3)
 Anna Wilson-Jones as Lady Emma Portman, Lady of the Bedchamber to the Queen (recurring series 1, main series 2–3)
 Diana Rigg as Matilda, Duchess of Buccleuch, the Queen's lady-in-waiting (series 2)
 Nicholas Audsley as Charles, Duke of Monmouth, the Duchess of Monmouth's husband (series 3)
 Sabrina Bartlett as Abigail Turner, Lady's maid to the Queen (series 3)
 David Burnett as Joseph Weld, Footman at Buckingham Palace (series 3)
 Kate Fleetwood as Princess Feodora, Victoria's half-sister (series 3)
 Bruno Wolkowitch (featured series 2) and Vincent Regan (main series 3) as King Louis Philippe, King of the French
 Lily Travers as Sophie, Duchess of Monmouth, the Queen's lady-in-waiting (series 3)
 John Sessions as Lord John Russell, Prime Minister of the United Kingdom (series 3)
 Laurence Fox as Lord Palmerston, Foreign Secretary; later Prime Minister of the United Kingdom (series 3)

Featured 
The actors below are credited in the opening titles of single episodes in which they play a significant role.
 Martin Compston as Dr Traill, Irish campaigner for Famine victims in Cork (series 2)
 Denis Lawson as The Duke of Atholl, the Queen's guard in a royal visit at Blair Castle (series 2)
 Sam Swainsbury as Dr John Snow, the Physician who traced the source of a cholera outbreak in London in 1854 (series 3)
 Edwin Thomas as Mr Caine, the Prince of Wales's tutor (series 3)

Recurring
 Peter Ivatts as William Howley, the Archbishop of Canterbury
 Tom Price as The Duke of Sutherland, the Duchess of Sutherland's husband (series 1–2)
 Robin Soans as Sir James Clark, Physician to the Queen (series 1–2)
 Samantha Colley as Eliza Skerrett, Nancy Skerrett's first cousin (series 1–2)
 Andrew Bicknell as The Duke of Saxe-Coburg and Gotha, Ernest's and Albert's father who is Victoria's maternal uncle (and the Duchess of Kent's and the King of the Belgians's older brother) (series 1–2)
 Hallie Woodhall (series 2) and Louisa Bay (series 3) as Princess Vicky, Victoria's and Albert's eldest daughter
 Mac Jackson (series 2) and Laurie Shepherd (series 3) as Prince Bertie, Victoria's and Albert's eldest son
 John Tueart as Lord Eversley, Speaker of the House (series 2–3)

Series 1
 Robin McCallum as Lord Portman, Lord Lieutenant of Somerset
 Nichola McAuliffe as Queen Frederica of Hanover, Victoria's paternal aunt by marriage
 Richard Dixon as Lord Cottenham, Lord Chancellor
 Alice Orr-Ewing as Lady Flora Hastings, the Duchess of Kent's lady-in-waiting
 Julian Finnigan as Lord Hastings, Lady Flora Hastings's brother
 Daniel Donskoy as Grand Duke Aleksandr, Tsesarevich of Russia
 Guy Oliver-Watts as Sir James Hayter, Principal Painter in Ordinary to the Queen
 Nicholas Agnew as Prince George of Cambridge, Victoria's first cousin who is the son of Victoria's paternal uncle, Prince Adolphus, Duke of Cambridge
 Basil Eidenbenz as Lohlein, Prince Albert's valet
 David Bamber as The Duke of Sussex, Victoria's paternal uncle
 Daisy Goodwin as The Duchess of Inverness, Victoria's paternal aunt by marriage
 Simon Paisley Day as The Earl of Uxbridge, Lord Chamberlain
 Robert MacPherson as Anson, Private Secretary to Prince Albert

Series 2
 Phil Rowson as John Bright MP, Member of Parliament for the City of Durham
 Tommy Rodger as Boy Jones, a boy who entered Buckingham Palace during 1838 to 1841
 Andrew Havill as Dr Pritchard
 Zaris-Angel Hator as Sarah Forbes, Captain Forbes's adopted daughter who is the Queen's goddaughter
 Ben Lamb as Captain Forbes, Sarah's adopted father
 Catherine Steadman as Mrs. Forbes, Sarah's adopted mother

Series 3
 Siobhan O'Carroll as Lady Lyttelton, the Prince of Wales's governess
 C.J. Beckford as William Cuffay, the Chartist Leader
 Ben Cartwright as Feargus O'Connor, Irish Chartist Leader
 Kerr Logan as Patrick Fitzgerald, the Irish Chartist
 Gregory Mann as William Monmouth, the Duke and Duchess of Monmouth's son
 Laura Morgan as Florence Nightingale, Trainer of Nurses during the Crimean War
 Hilton McRae as George Combe, Scottish Lawyer who wrote The Constitution of Man
 Hugh Simon as Colonel Sibthorp, Member of Parliament for Lincoln
 Bernard Melling as Guard
 Pandora Clifford as Emily Palmerston, Lord Palmerston's wife
 David Newman as Henry Cole, Great Exhibition's organiser
 Tristram Wymark as Lord Taunton, Secretary of State for the Colonies
 Christopher Brand as Joseph Paxton, The Crystal Palace's designer
 Ellen Evans as Princess Adelheid "Heidi", Victoria's half-niece

Episodes

Series 1 (2016)

Series 2 (2017)

Series 3 (2019)

Production

Development 
The series was announced in September 2015, following Coleman's decision to leave Doctor Who to join the cast as Queen Victoria. Daisy Goodwin said in October 2016 that a Christmas special episode for the 2016 series had been proposed and was rejected by ITV; one was subsequently commissioned for 2017 after the rising ratings popularity for Victoria.

In September 2016, ITV renewed Victoria for a second series, followed by a Christmas special. In December 2017, Victoria was renewed for a third series, with Coleman and Hughes set to return. Beyond the renewal, ITV administration reportedly expects Victoria to run for a total of six series, although whether Jenna Coleman will remain as the lead actress as the series moves into depicting Victoria's later years is uncertain. After the conclusion of the third series, Coleman stated that the programme will "take a break" while a fourth series was planned. In July 2021, ITV confirmed that there were no active plans for a fourth series.

Producers Mammoth Screen picked Screen Yorkshire's Church Fenton Studios which is in Tadcaster North Yorkshire, as the central base for the recreation of Buckingham Palace.  Church Fenton Studios recently launched, so Victoria subsequently became the first production to film there. It is the first time Yorkshire has needed a large scale studio space to host a major drama. Mammoth Screen spent seven months filming the first series in Yorkshire.

Filming 
Much of Victoria is filmed in Yorkshire. The interiors of Castle Howard double as Kensington Palace, Harewood House stands in for Buckingham Palace, with Bramham Park and Wentworth Woodhouse also being in use for both royal residences. Carlton Towers is in use as Windsor Castle, while Beverley Minster replaces Westminster Abbey. Other locations include Raby Castle, Allerton Castle, Newby Hall and Whitby West Pier. Church Fenton Studios, a converted aircraft hangar at Leeds East Airport near Selby, was in use to recreate some interiors of Buckingham Palace. Parts of Liverpool's Georgian quarter were used for exterior locations for the filming of the third series.

Filming for the third series began in May 2018, after filming for The Cry, another series that Coleman starred in, commenced in Australia in February 2018, and concluded in May 2018, so that production on the third series of Victoria could commence.

Music 

The theme song is by Martin Phipps, sung by the Mediæval Bæbes. Phipps also wrote and conducted incidental music for the early episodes. For later episodes the conducting role was undertaken by Ruth Barrett. An official soundtrack for the first series was released digitally on 12 January 2017. A CD issue followed in 2018.

On 23 February 2019, Barrett posted via her Instagram she would be releasing a second official soundtrack to accompany the second and third series. The second official soundtrack was released 22 February 2019 via Amazon for the United States and will be released at a later date for the United Kingdom.

Release

Broadcast
The eight-episode first series premiered on ITV on 28 August 2016 in the UK, and on PBS on 15 January 2017 in the United States as part of Masterpiece. The series premiered on 4 April 2017 in Canada on Vision TV, and January 2019 on ViuTV6 in Hong Kong.

The eight-episode second series premiered on ITV on 27 August 2017, and on PBS on 14 January 2018. The second series premiered in Canada on 26 September 2018 on Vision TV.

The eight-episode third series was broadcast on PBS from 13 January to 3 March 2019, before the series was broadcast in the UK, where it aired on ITV from 24 March to 12 May 2019.

Home media
In Region 2, the first series of Victoria was released on DVD and Blu-ray on 10 October 2016. The second series was released on DVD and Blu-ray on 13 November 2017. The 2017 feature-length Christmas Special was released on DVD 26 December 2017.

In Region 1, the first series of Victoria was released on DVD and Blu-ray on 31 January 2017. The second series of Victoria was released on DVD and Blu-ray on 30 January 2018.

Reception

Critical reception
The critics' reviews of the first series have been positive. On Rotten Tomatoes, the first series holds a rating of 80%, based on 40 reviews, with an average rating of 6.77/10. The site's consensus reads: "Strong performances by Jenna Coleman and Rufus Sewell hint at Downton-esque potential for Victoria, but the narrative falls just shy of that soapy mark."

The second series holds a rating of 87%, based on 15 reviews, with an average rating of 6.17/10. The site's consensus reads: "Victoria's sophomore series finds this striking period drama returning with a second batch of episodes that are just as absorbing as its first."

On Metacritic, the first series has a score of 67 out of 100, based on 22 critics, indicating "generally favourable reviews".

Mehera Bonner of Marie Claire wrote: "Stunning, addictive...and ridiculously romantic".

Matthew Gilbert of The Boston Globe wrote: "Captivating [and] unforgettable".

Historical accuracy
Victoria's writer Daisy Goodwin said that the drama was inspired by real events: "...whether they are assassination attempts, the repeal of the Corn Laws, or the terrible potato famine...All the big building blocks of the series are true."

The Duchess of Sutherland is inaccurately depicted as carrying on an improbable romance with prince (later duke) Ernest of Saxe-Coburg and Gotha, who is also inaccurately depicted as being unmarried at the time. Margaret Clunie told RadioTimes.com: "Harriet Sutherland had a famously happy marriage with the Duke of Sutherland and they had these 11 children and lived happily ever after. So we have slightly deviated away from the truth."

The story lines are a blending of history, historical inaccuracies, and characters invented for dramatic purposes. In some cases, the historical figures are indistinguishable from invented characters in all but name, with the traits, actions, and experiences having little to do with the real lives of those supposedly portrayed. For example, Dame Diana Rigg was cast to play an elderly and curmudgeonly Duchess of Buccleuch even though the real woman was in her 30s when at court, and older sister Feodora is made into a spiteful schemer living for an extended period of some years with Victoria and Albert, although letters reveal the sisters seemingly had an affectionate bond that made them faithful correspondents across years and distance, with visits relatively rare.

Robert Peel's Private Secretary Edward Drummond is shown as having a relationship with Lord Alfred Paget, but there is no evidence that either of the men were gay or had any same-sex relationships. Drummond was fatally shot in 1843, not in 1846, as portrayed. His shooting was likely a case of mistaken identity, rather than his being shot when defending Peel. He was aged 51 when he died, so was considerably older than the character featured in the series. Paget did not become the Queen's Chief Equerry until 1846. He was born in 1816, so at the time portrayed he would have been of an age similar to the character in the series.

Frances Mulraney wrote on IrishCentral that "Faith, Hope & Charity" episode "overplays the extent to which Queen Victoria sought to aid the famine Irish in the 1840s, exaggerating her interest in Ireland." English-born historian Christine Kinealy, founding director of Ireland's Great Hunger Institute at Quinnipiac University, who has studied Queen Victoria's diaries and the writings of Prime Ministers Peel and Russell, said: "There is no evidence that she had any real compassion for the Irish people in any way." Irish clergyman Robert Traill, who wrote a letter that makes it to the newspapers, had never met Victoria. The creator of the show, Daisy Goodwin, said: "I thought [Robert Traill's] story would be a good way to illustrate the terrible way in which the Irish were treated by the British government."

Accolades

Notes

References

External links
 
 

 https://www.nytimes.com/2017/01/11/arts/television/a-woman-at-the-helm-bringing-victoria-to-life.html

2016 British television series debuts
2019 British television series endings
2010s British drama television series
Cultural depictions of Queen Victoria on television
Cultural depictions of Arthur Wellesley, 1st Duke of Wellington
English-language television shows
ITV television dramas
Television series by ITV Studios
Television series by Mammoth Screen
Television series set in the 1830s
Television series set in the 1840s
Television series set in the 1850s
Television shows set in the United Kingdom
Cultural depictions of Albert, Prince Consort
Television shows shot in Liverpool